Dora Elvira García González is a Mexican professor and researcher with the Monterrey Institute of Technology and Higher Studies (Tec de Monterrey) as well as director of the humanities school of the Mexico City Campus. Her research work has been recognized by Level II membership in the Mexico’s Sistema Nacional de Investigadores.

Career
García González received a bachelor's degree from the Universidad Iberoamericana in 1980, followed by a master's and doctorate from the Universidad Nacional Autónoma de México in philosophy in 1993 and 1998 respectively.

Her academic specialties in ethics, political philosophy, hermeneutics and philosophy of culture. She has taught at the undergraduate level at the Tec de Monterrey, Autonomous University of Campeche, the University of Granada, Spain, the Universidad Iberoamericana and the Universidad Intercontinental. At the graduate level, she has taught since 1998 courses on multiculturalism, contemporary ethics, entrepreneurial philosophy, philosophical research, philosophy of the social sciences, cultural analysis and more at Tec de Monterrey and other institutions. She has been a visiting scholar at the University of Granada, Spain, the National University of Comahue and the University of Barcelona.

She began her career teaching with the Universidad Iberoamericana from 1980 to 1985, then was a full-time professor and researcher at the Universidad Intercontinental from 1985 to 2003, creating the masters program in philosophy and criticism in 1996. Research projects have included the inclusion of women in Mexico's military academies for SEDENA in 2008, coordinating the justice and human rights project (2013), a multiculturalism seminar at UNAM from 2002 to 2004, a project on philosophical rhetoric in 2001 and 2002, "Philosophy and cultural criticism" with CONACYT in 2001 and with the Universidad Intercontinental from 1999 to 2004 and participation with the Círculo de Hermenéutica group from 1995 to 2001 on various projects. Her research work has been recognized by the Sistema Nacional de Investigadores with Level II membership.

She is currently the director of the humanities department of the Tec de Monterrey, Mexico City Campus,  serving also as the academic leader of strategic projects in humanities since 2009 and the coordinator of the UNESCO group in ethics and human rights at the campus.

García González  has worked as a consultant for various banks, in education and in hospitals and other medical organizations. In 2007, she founded a journal called En-claves del pensamiento  with the Humanities and Social Sciences Division of the Tec de Monterrey which she still directs. According to her curriculum she also speaks English, French, Italian and German.

Publications

Books
 Del poder político al amor al mundo (2005)
 Hermenéutica analógica, logros y perspectivas (2004)
 El liberalismo hoy. Una reconstrucción crítica del pensamiento de Rawls (2002)
 Hermenéutica analógica, política y cultura (2001)
 Variaciones en torno al liberalismo. Una aproximación al pensamiento político de John Rawls (2001)

Edited
 Dignidad y exclusión. Retos y desafíos teórico-prácticos de los derechos humanos (2009)
 Ética, profesión y ciudadanía: una ética cívica para la vida (2008)
 Ética, persona y sociedad: una ética para la vida (2007)
 El sentido de la política: Hannah Arendt (2007)
 Hermenéutica analógica y género (2003)
 Filosofía  y crítica de la cultura. una reflexión desde la diversidad (2002)
 Filosofía y literatura: coloquio (2000)

Book chapters
 Semejanzas  differencias entre la analogía beuchotiana y el ‘sentido común de G.B. Vico in Relación con la diversidad cultural in Hermenéutica, Analogía y Filosofía actual (2009)
 Retórica y Discurso en el pensamiento político de Hannah Arendt in Crisis de la historia. Condena de la política y desafíos sociales (2009)
 Responsabilidad, compasión y esperanza: fundamentos para la construcción de relaciones personales y culturales justas in Ensayos sobre Filosofía, Crítica y Cultura (2009)
 Baltazar Gracián y la cultura del humanismo barroco in Baluarte del humanismo. Literatura, Lengua y Cultura (2009)
 La guerra como prueba de fuego para la construcción del cosmopolitismo: la paz como proyecto de una ciudadanía cosmopolita in Ciudadanía y Autonomía (2008)
 Ética cívica en la vida profesional in Ética, profesión y ciudadanía (2008)
 La disobediencia civil en Hannah Arendt: una propuesta política para la recuperación de la esfera pública y el alcance de la justicia in El sentido de la política: Hannah Arendt (2007)
 Ética y memoria. Implicaciones ético-políticas de la memoria. El perdón, una posibilidad de recomenzar in Más allá del olvido (2008)
 Reflexiones en torno al concepto de muerte en Hannah Arendt in Miradas sobre la muerte. Aproximaciones desde la literatura, la filosofía y el psicoanálisis (2008)
 Filosofía y cultura in Filosofía actual: en perspectiva latinoamericana (2008)
 Responsabilidad, compasión y esperanza: fundamentos para la construcción de relaciones personales y culturales justas in El debate por la vida (2008)
 John Rawls en Erick Ávalos in  Pensadores del Siglo XX (2008)
 Hannah Ardent  in Pensadores del Siglo XX (2008)

See also
List of Monterrey Institute of Technology and Higher Education faculty

References

21st-century Mexican philosophers
Mexican ethicists
Hermeneutists
Living people
Academic staff of the Monterrey Institute of Technology and Higher Education
National Autonomous University of Mexico alumni
Social philosophers
Political philosophers
Universidad Iberoamericana alumni
Academic staff of Universidad Iberoamericana
Academic staff of the University of Granada
Philosophers of culture
Mexican women philosophers
Year of birth missing (living people)